Charles Hubbard may refer to:
Charles Hubbard (American football), American football player
Charles Hubbard (artist) (1801–1875), American artist
Charles Hubbard (archer) (1849–1923), American archer
Charles Edward Hubbard (1900–1980), English botanist
Charles Hubbard (politician) (1940–2020), Canadian politician

See also